Bruce Edwards may refer to:
Bruce Edwards (actor) (1911–2002), American actor and photographer
Bruce Edwards (baseball) (1923–1975), MLB catcher
Bruce L. Edwards (1952–2015), C. S. Lewis scholar
Bruce Edwards (caddie) (1954–2004)

See also
Bruce Edwards Ivins (1946–2008), anthrax terrorist